The New One! also released as Take it Away! is a 1968 studio recording by the Buddy Rich Big Band.

Track listing 
LP side A
 "Away We Go" (Ferguson) – 3:11
 "Machine" (Reddie) – 3:38
 "The Rotten Kid" (Greco) – 5:11
 "New Blues" (Piestrup) – 4:54
 "Something for Willie" (Boice) – 4:08
 "Standing up in a Hammock" (Potts) – 2:40
LP side B
 "Chicago" (Fred Fisher) – 2:08
 "Luv" (Mulligan) – 2:56
 "I Can't Get Started" (Vernon Duke, Ira Gershwin) – 3:50
 "Group Shot" (Piestrup) – 5:07
 "Diabolus" (Ferguson) – 8:58
bonus tracks on CD re-issue:
 "Away We Go" (alt. take) – 3:00
 "The Rotten Kid" (alt. take) – 4:14
 "Diabolus" (alt. take) – 8:58
 "Old Timey" (Florence) – 3:15
 "Naptown Blues" (Montgomery) – 4:25

Personnel 
 Ernie Watts – alto saxophone
 Charles Owens – alto saxophone (tracks A1, A3, B5)
 James Mosher – alto saxophone (tracks A2, A4-B4)
 Jay Corre – tenor saxophone
 Pascel LaBarbera – tenor saxophone (tracks A1, A3, B5)
 Robert Keller – tenor saxophone (tracks A2, A4-B4)
 Frank Capi – baritone saxophone (tracks A1, A3, B5)
 Meyer Hirsch – baritone saxophone (tracks A2, A4-B4)
 Chuck Findley – trumpet
 John Sotille – trumpet
 Yoshito Murakami – trumpet
 Russell Iverson – trumpet (tracks A1, A3, B5)
 Ollie Mitchell – trumpet (tracks A2, A4-B4)
 Robert Brawn – trombone
 John Boice – trombone (tracks A2, A4-B4)
 Sam Burtis – trombone (tracks A1, A3, B5)
 Jack Spurlock – trombone (tracks A1, A3, B5)
 James Trimble – trombone (tracks A2, A4-B4)
 Ray Starling – piano (tracks A2, A4-B4)
 Russel Turner, Jr. – piano (tracks A1, A3, B5)
 Richie Resnicoff – guitar
 James Gannon – bass
 Ronald Fudoli – bass (tracks A1, A3, B5)
 Buddy Rich – drums

References 

 Pacific Jazz Records ST 20126
 Liberty Records LBL 83090

Buddy Rich albums
Pacific Jazz Records albums
1968 albums